Ouessa is a department or commune of Ioba Province in south-eastern Burkina Faso. Its capital lies at the town of Ouessa. It shares a border with Ghana to the south.

Towns and villages
Ouessa

References

Departments of Burkina Faso
Ioba Province